Mama, I'm Home is a 2021 Russian drama film directed by Vladimir Bitokov. It was theatrically released in Russia on September 9, 2021.

Plot 
In Kabardino-Balkaria, a bus driver named Tonya is waiting for the return of her son, who left to fight in Syria. Upon learning that her son has been killed, she refuses to believe it and begins a fight to bring him back home.

Cast

References

External links 
 

2021 films
2020s Russian-language films
2021 drama films
Russian drama films